Maxhütte-Haidhof is a municipality in the district of Schwandorf, in Bavaria, Germany. It is situated 21 km north of Regensburg.

References

Schwandorf (district)